Kolyo Neshev (born May 30, 1982 in Kazanlak) is a Bulgarian javelin thrower. He represented Bulgaria at the 2008 Summer Olympics in Beijing, and competed in the men's javelin throw. Neshev threw the javelin, with a possible best mark and distance of 66.00 metres, finishing only in thirty-sixth place.

Neshev is also a sixteenth-time national record holder in the javelin throw, with a highest possible achievement of 63.32 metres, having won a gold medal at the 2012 European Winter Throwing Championships in Sofia.

References

External links
 
 NBC 2008 Olympics profile 

Bulgarian male javelin throwers
Living people
Olympic athletes of Bulgaria
Athletes (track and field) at the 2008 Summer Olympics
People from Kazanlak
1982 births
21st-century Bulgarian people